James George (November 8, 1800 – August 26, 1870) was the acting Principal of Queen's University from 1853 to 1857. He oversaw the establishment of the School of Medicine and the expansion of the Faculty of Arts.

In 1854, George helped to bring the Reverend George Weir over from Scotland as a professor of classical literature. Relations between the two were amiable until Weir accused George of fathering his sister's illegitimate child. George stepped down amidst the scandal, but the matter was never fully investigated and he kept his post as the professor of moral philosophy. In frustration, Weir penned a 16 canto epic poem mocking the former principal.

After several years of continued accusations from Weir, George retired to a ministry in Stratford, Ontario, where he spent the remainder of his days. The charges against him were never proven one way or the other.

References

1801 births
1870 deaths
Principals of Queen's University at Kingston